Vladimer Aptsiauri (4 February 1962 – 14 May 2012) was a Soviet fencer. He won a gold medal in the team foil event at the 1988 Summer Olympics.

References

External links
 

1962 births
2012 deaths
Soviet male fencers
Olympic fencers of the Soviet Union
Fencers at the 1988 Summer Olympics
Olympic gold medalists for the Soviet Union
Olympic medalists in fencing
People from Samegrelo-Zemo Svaneti
Medalists at the 1988 Summer Olympics